Lisa Blamèble (born 15 September 1992, in Paris) is a French athlete, who specializes in the 800 meters.

Biographie 
In 2012 and 2013, she won the Under 23 national title, and won also that year's French Elite National Indoor Championships for the 800m in the time 2:04.87.

In May 2014, at the IAAF World Relay Championships, at Nassau, Lisa Blamèble set a new French record in the 4 × 800 m relay in 8:17.54, in the company of Justine Fedronic,  Clarisse Moh and Renelle Lamote.

She won the 2015 French Championships, at Villeneuve d'Ascq in a time 2:05.00.

Prize list  
 French Championships in Athletics   :  
 winner of the 800m 2015   
 French Indoor Athletics Championships:  
 winner of the 800m 2013

Records

Notes and references

External links  
 

1992 births
Living people
French female middle-distance runners
Athletes from Paris
21st-century French women